Lee Il-hwa (born February 24, 1971) is a South Korean actress. She made her acting debut in 1991, and has since appeared in numerous television dramas, notably the Reply series.

Filmography

Film

Television series

Web series

Theater

Awards and nominations

References

External links

20th-century South Korean actresses
21st-century South Korean actresses
South Korean television actresses
South Korean film actresses
Living people
1971 births
People from North Gyeongsang Province